Jimi Bolakoro is a Fijian rugby footballer who represented Fiji in rugby league at the 2000 World Cup.

Playing career
Bolakoro represented Fiji at the 2000 Rugby League World Cup, playing one match at centre.

Bolakoro moved to Sri Lanka in 2003 and aimed to represent the country in rugby union. He joined the Colombo Hockey and Football Club and played in Sri Lanka's domestic competition.

References

Living people
Fiji national rugby league team players
Fijian expatriate sportspeople in Sri Lanka
Fijian rugby league players
Fijian rugby union players
I-Taukei Fijian people
Place of birth missing (living people)
Rugby league centres
Rugby union centres
Year of birth missing (living people)